Mark Hayes (born March 28, 1953) is an American composer and arranger. His predominant output is of choral music in the Christian sacred music and gospel music genres.

Biography 
Hayes was born in Ladysmith, Wisconsin. After receiving a bachelor's degree in piano performance magna cum laude from Baylor University in 1975, he entered a career in composing and arranging music.

Hayes' influence in the sacred choral and piano genres have brought him international recognition.

Works 
Hayes has written numerous choral arrangements of sacred music and has more than 1,000 publications. He has also published several books of arrangements for solo singers and solo piano, including 10 Christmas Songs for Solo Voice, 10 Spirituals for Solo Voice, and 10 Hymns and Gospel Songs for Solo Voice.

In 2004, Hayes premiered a contemporary setting of the ancient hymn Te Deum at Carnegie Hall, set for choir and soloists.

Awards 
He is a recurring recipient of the Standard Award from ASCAP, and was given the Dove Award for Praise and Worship Album of the Year in 1986. He also received the Award for Exemplary Leadership in Christian Music from Baylor University Center for Christian Music Studies.

References

External links 

 Lorenz biography: Mark Hayes (b. 1953)

Gospel music composers
Baylor University alumni
1953 births
Living people
People from Ladysmith, Wisconsin